Justin Shonga (born 5 November 1996), is a Zambian footballer who currently plays as a forward for South African side Sekhukhune United.

Club career
Shonga signed with South African side Orlando Pirates in late 2017 from Nkwazi F.C. of his native Zambia.

Career statistics

Club

Notes

International

International goals
Scores and results list Zambia's goal tally first.

References

1996 births
Living people
Zambian footballers
Zambian expatriate footballers
Association football forwards
Nkwazi F.C. players
South African Premier Division players
Orlando Pirates F.C. players
Expatriate soccer players in South Africa
Zambian expatriate sportspeople in South Africa
Zambia international footballers